Pingshu is a town in Dacheng County, in Hebei province, China. , it has 12 residential neighborhoods and 46 villages under its administration.
Residential neighborhoods
Dongsheng
Chengsheng
Gongjiaoli
Chenxingli
Chaoyangli
Donghuan
Hepingli
Xiangheli
Nanhuan
Yijing
Jinbaodong Road
Jinyuyuan

Villages
Dongguan Village
Beiguan Village
Xiguan Village
Nanguan Village
Dongwangxiang Village
Xiwangxiang Village
Jiaozhuang Village
Wangzhuang Village
Tianzhuang Village
Xichenzhuang Village
Renchang Village
Songzhuang Village
Bianzhuang Village
Erguyuan Village
Dongchenzhuang Village
Dongcuizhuang Village
Jiazhuang Village
Wangpeizhuang Village
Zhengpeizhuang Village
Zhangpeizhuang Village
Daipeizhuang Village
Hanpeizhuang Village
Bafang Village
Dalibei Village
Sunlibei Village
Liulibei Village
Libeidian Village
Weilibei Village
Beilizhuang Village
Datongzi Village
Xiaotongzi Village
Liangdouzhuang Village
Wufang Village
Caiyuan Village
Dongjinbei Village
Xijinbei Village
Youfang Village
Beiwangxiang Village
Yazhuang Village
Daxianglian Village
Xiaoxianglian Village
Xingzhuang Village
Dawangdu Village
Xiaowangdu Village
Wen Village
Xingyuan Village

References

Township-level divisions of Hebei
Dacheng County